PAAZ (gene) may refer to:
 3-Oxo-5,6-dehydrosuberyl-CoA semialdehyde dehydrogenase, an enzyme
 Oxepin-CoA hydrolase, an enzyme